Greg Marcks (born August 12, 1976) is an American director and screenwriter of motion pictures.

Early life
Marcks grew up in the town of Chelmsford, Massachusetts and attended Chelmsford High School. He studied creative writing at Carnegie Mellon University in Pittsburgh, Pennsylvania. He went on to receive an M.F.A in directing from the Florida State University Film Conservatory in Tallahassee, Florida, where he wrote and directed Lector, a short film which won several awards at film festivals including a Student Academy Award from the Academy of Motion Picture Arts and Sciences.

Career
Marcks wrote and directed the highly acclaimed indie film 11:14 starring Hilary Swank, Patrick Swayze, Barbara Hershey, Rachael Leigh Cook, Ben Foster, and Colin Hanks.

His film Echelon Conspiracy, an action thriller film starring Shane West, Edward Burns, Martin Sheen, Jonathan Pryce and Ving Rhames was released theatrically in the U.S. on February 27, 2009. The film, though fiction, deals with the real-world SIGINT collection program ECHELON, run by the NSA.  However, the movie bombed at the box office.

Marcks' next project, a film based on You Don't Love Me Yet, a novel by Jonathan Lethem, deals with the romantic escapades of bandmates living in the Silver Lake neighborhood of Los Angeles, California.

Filmography

Film

External links
 
 

Living people
Florida State University alumni
People from Concord, Massachusetts
1976 births
Carnegie Mellon University alumni
Film directors from Massachusetts
Chelmsford High School alumni